This is a partial discography of composer Charles Wuorinen.
 It Happens Like This / Fourth Piano Sonata / Alphabetical Ashbery. Anne-Marie MacDermott, piano, loadbang, The Group for Contemporary Music, composer conducting, Bridge Records 9490
 Eighth Symphony (Theologoumena) / Fourth Piano Concerto. Peter Serkin, piano, Boston Symphony Orchestra, James Levine, conducting. Bridge Records 9474
 Scherzo / First String Quartet / Viola Variations / Second Piano Quintet. Peter Serkin, piano, Brentano String Quartet, Curtis Macomber, violin, Jesse Mills, violin, Lois Martin, viola, Fred Sherry, cello. Naxos Records 8.559694.
 Ashberyana / Fenton Songs / Fenton Songs II / Praegustatum / Ave Christe: Josquin / Josquiniana. Leon Williams, baritone, Lucy Shelton soprano, James Pugh, trombone Brentano String Quartet, Sarah Rothenberg, piano. Naxos 8.559377
 String Sextet / String Quartet No. 2 / Piano Quintet / Divertimento for string quartet. Chamber Music Society of Lincoln Center, Tashi, Ursula Oppens, The Group for Contemporary Music. Naxos 8.559288
 Dante Trilogy: The Mission of Virgil / The Great Procession / The River of Light. (chamber version, live recording), The Group for Contemporary Music, Oliver Knussen, conductor. Naxos 8.559345
 Tashi / Percussion Quartet / Fortune. Tashi, The Group for Contemporary Music, New Jersey Percussion Ensemble. Naxos 8.559321
 Horn Trio / Horn Trio Continued / Trombone Trio / Trio for Bass Instruments / Double Solo for Horn Trio. The Group for Contemporary Music. Naxos 8.559264
 Cyclops 2000 / A Reliquary for Igor Stravinsky. London Sinfonietta, Oliver Knussen, conductor. London Sinfonietta label 859811 (Reliquary previously issued on DGG)
 On Alligators / Fourth String Quartet / Natural Fantasy / Third Piano Concerto. Kevin Bowyer, organ, Brentano String Quartet, Garrick Ohlsson, piano, San Francisco Symphony, Herbert Blomstedt, conductor. Tzadik Records 8010
 Time's Encomium / Lepton / New York Notes / Epithalamium. SurPlus Ensemble, Chamber Music Society of Lincoln Center, Wuorinen conducting, Paul Christopher Gekker and Mark Gould, trumpets. Tzadik Records 7077 /
 Duos: Sonata for Guitar and Piano / Never Again The Same / Duo Sonata for Flute and Piano / Divertimento for Alto Saxophone and Piano / Eleven Short Pieces / Psalm 39 / Percussion Duo. William Anderson (guitarist), Joan Forsyth, piano, Wilbur Pauley, bass, Christopher Hall, tuba, Thomas Meglioranza, baritone, Robert Aitken (composer), flute, James Avery (musician), piano, John Ferrari, percussion, Margaret Kampmeier, piano, Erik Carlson, violin, Michael Caterisano, percussion, Eliot Gattego, alto saxophone, Eric Wubbels, piano. Albany Records TROY1077
 Five Concerto for Amplified Cello and Orchestra / The Golden Dance / Concerto for Amplified Violin and Orchestra. Fred Sherry, cello, Orchestra of St. Luke's, Wuorinen conductor, San Francisco Symphony, Herbert Blomstedt conducting, Paul Zukofsky, violin, Radio-Sinfonie-Orchester Frankfurt, Eliahu Inbal, conductor. Albany Records TROY711
 The Haroun Songbook. Elizabeth Farnum, soprano, Emily Golden, mezzo-soprano, James Schaffner, tenor, Michael Chioldi, bass-baritone, Phillip Bush, piano, Albany Records TROY664
 Fast Fantasy / An Orbicle of Jasp / Andante espressivo / Cello Variations / Cello Variations II / Cello Variations III / Grand Union. Fred Sherry, cello, Charles Wuorinen, piano, Thomas Kolor, percussion. Albany Records TROY658
  Hyperion / Archaeopteryx / arrangement of Schoenberg's Variations for Orchestra, Op. 31 / Webern's arrangement of Schoenberg's Five Pieces for Orchestra op. 16. St. Luke' Chamber Ensemble, Charles Wuorinen, conductor, David Taylor, bass trombone Richard Moredock, Cameron Grant, James Winn pianos. Albany Records TROY992
 Vocal Works: Two Machine Portraits (Les Murray (poet)), The Long Boat (Stanley Kunitz), Twang (Wallace Stevens), Lightening viii (Seamus Heaney), September 11, 2001 (W.H. Auden), Fenton Songs, Christes Crosse, Pentecost (Derek Walcott), A Song to the Lute in Musicke, Stanzas Before Time (John Ashbery), A Winter's Tale (Dylan Thomas). Albany Records TROY968
 Hyperion / Archaeopteryx / arr. of Arnold Schoenberg's Variations for Orchestra, Op. 31 / Webern's arrangement of Schoenberg's Five Pieces for Orchestra, Op. 16. Albany Records, TROY992
 Genesis / A solis ortu / Mass (for the Restoration of St. Luke in the Fields) / Ave Christie: Josquin. Minnesota Orchestra & Chorale, Edo de Waart, conductor, Charles Wuorinen, piano,

External links
 

Discographies of American artists